Antonio Castro Leache (10 May 1944 – 18 March 2022) was a Spanish politician. A member of the Spanish Socialist Workers' Party, he served in the Corts Valencianes from 1987 to 1999. He died on 18 March 2022 at the age of 77.

References

1944 births
2022 deaths
20th-century Spanish politicians
Members of the Corts Valencianes
Members of the 2nd Corts Valencianes
Members of the 3rd Corts Valencianes
Members of the 4th Corts Valencianes
Unión General de Trabajadores members
Spanish Socialist Workers' Party politicians
People from the Province of Cuenca